Bulgar may refer to:
Bulgars, extinct people of Central Asia
Bulgar language, the extinct language of the Bulgars
Oghur languages

Bulgar may also refer to:
Bolghar, the capital city of Volga Bulgaria
Bulgur, a wheat product
Bulgar, an Ashkenazi Jewish dance form used in Klezmer music

See also
Bulgarian (disambiguation)
Bolgar (disambiguation)
Vulgar (disambiguation)
Volgar (disambiguation)
Balgar, a Bulgarian animated web series
Old Great Bulgaria
Danube Bulgaria
Volga Bulgaria

Language and nationality disambiguation pages